Apodemini is a tribe of muroid rodents in the subfamily Murinae. It contains two extant genera, one found throughout Eurasia and the other endemic to the Ryukyu Islands. Several fossil genera are also known from throughout Eurasia, including one large species (Rhagamys) that persisted on Sardinia and Corsica up until at least the first millennium BC, when it was likely wiped out by human activity.

Species

Recent species 
Species in the tribe include:
 Genus Apodemus - Old World field mice
 Striped field mouse, Apodemus agrarius
 Alpine field mouse, Apodemus alpicola
 Small Japanese field mouse, Apodemus argenteus
 Chevrier's field mouse, Apodemus chevrieri
 South China field mouse, Apodemus draco
 Yellow-necked mouse, Apodemus flavicollis – includes A. arianus
 Himalayan field mouse, Apodemus gurkha
 Caucasus field mouse, Apodemus hyrcanicus
 Sichuan field mouse, Apodemus latronum
 Pygmy field mouse, Apodemus microps
 Eastern broad-toothed field mouse, Apodemus mystacinus
 Western broad-toothed field mouse, Apodemus epimelas
 Ward's field mouse, Apodemus pallipes
 Korean field mouse, Apodemus peninsulae
 Black Sea field mouse, Apodemus ponticus
 Kashmir field mouse, Apodemus rusiges
 Taiwan field mouse, Apodemus semotus
 Large Japanese field mouse, Apodemus speciosus
 Wood mouse, Apodemus sylvaticus
 Ural field mouse, Apodemus uralensis 
 Steppe field mouse, Apodemus witherbyi
 Genus Tokudaia - Ryūkyū spiny rats
 Muennink's spiny rat, Tokudaia muenninki
 Ryukyu spiny rat, Tokudaia osimensis
 Tokunoshima spiny rat, Tokudaia tokunoshimensis

Fossil genera 

 Genus †Parapodemus (Miocene to Pleistocene of Eurasia)
 †Parapodemus coronensis
 †Parapodemus gaudryi
 †Parapodemus lugdunensis
 †Parapodemus meini
 Genus †Progonomys
†Progonomys cathalai
†Progonomys hispanicus
†Progonomys hussaini
†Progonomys manolo
†Progonomys morganae
†Progonomys orientalis
†Progonomys woelferi
Genus †Rhagamys (Late Pleistocene of Sardinia and Corsica)
 †Hensel's field mouse, Rhagamys orthodon (extinct circa 1000 B.C.)
 Genus †Rhagapodemus (Miocene to Pleistocene of Europe)
 †Rhagapodemus vandeweerdi
Genus †Stephanomys
†Stephanomys ramblensis
†Stephanomys stadii
†Stephanomys progressus

References 

Old World rats and mice
Mammal tribes